Woking railway station is a major stop in Woking, England, on the South West Main Line used by many commuters. The station is managed by South Western Railway, who operate all trains serving it.

History

The London and Southampton Railway (L&SR) was authorised on 25 July 1834 and construction began in October of that year. Woking Common station was built with two platforms linked by a footbridge and a small freight yard was also provided. Nevertheless, it quickly became the railhead for west Surrey and the main entrance was positioned on the south side of the tracks for the convenience of those travelling by stagecoach from Guildford. Construction of Woking town centre, to the north of the station, did not begin until the mid-1860s.

The station was given its current name of "Woking" in around 1843. The Guildford Junction Railway (GJR) opened on 5 May 1845, having been authorised less than a year earlier, on 10 May 1844. The GJR was always operated by the LSWR, and was absorbed by that company on 4 August 1845.

The track through Woking station was quadrupled in 1904 and electrified in 1937. The station was rebuilt by the Southern Railway in the Art Deco "Odeon" style in 1936-37. The signal box, which was constructed as part of the rebuilding programme, is a Grade II listed building.

Accidents and incidents
Three trains were involved in a collision just east of the station on 23 December 1955. A Portsmouth line electric train came to a stand at signals near the Maybury Hill Road bridge. The following steam-hauled Waterloo-Basingstoke train overran the Maybury distant signal and collided with the rear of the electric train, demolishing the guards compartment and deflecting the rear bogie so that it was foul of the up-line. An up Bournemouth steam-hauled train had just left the station and came into sidelong collision with the bogie and came to a stand. Out of around 1000 passengers and crew on the three trains only 21 were injured, including the guard of the electric train, and there were no fatalities. The Ministry of Transport and Civil Aviation report concluded the crash was due to human error on the part of the driver of the Basingstoke train. The Basingstoke train locomotive, SR N15X class 32327 Trevithick, was damaged beyond economic repair and scrapped at Eastleigh Works.

Services

Passenger
Many South Western Railway services call at Woking, including:
 the Alton Line calling at stations to Alton
 the Portsmouth Direct Line to Guildford and stations to Portsmouth
 the South West Main Line to Winchester, Southampton, Bournemouth, Poole and Weymouth 
 the West of England Main Line to Andover, Salisbury and Exeter 
 The station is a terminus of the Waterloo to Woking stopping service

Fast trains from Woking take approximately 26 minutes to reach London Waterloo (some stop at Clapham Junction). Trains from the Alton Line take roughly 35 minutes, and the stopping service 50 minutes, to Waterloo.

An hourly RailAir bus service runs between the bus station on the north side of the station and Heathrow Airport, a journey of about 50 minutes.

As of December 2022, the off-peak Monday to Saturday services are as follows:

 12 tph to London Waterloo (2 of these are stopping services, 2 of such stop only at Clapham Junction, 4 of which are semi fast and the remaining 4 are non-stop)
 2 tph to Alton (semi-fast)
 1 tph to Weymouth via Bournemouth (fast) 
 1 tph to Haslemere via Godalming (stopping)
 2 tph to Basingstoke (stopping)
 2 tph to Portsmouth Harbour via Guildford (1 fast, 1 stopping)
 1 tph to Portsmouth Harbour via Eastleigh (stopping) 
 1 tph to Exeter St Davids via Salisbury

Platform layout

Woking Station has six platforms, two of which are bay platforms.
Platform 1 – Semi-fast London-bound services.
Platform 2 – Fast London-bound services.  Part of a single island with 3 and 4 below.
Platform 3 – East-facing bay for stopping service to and from London Waterloo. At the end of platforms 2 and 4.
Platform 4 – Trains to Exeter St Davids, Portsmouth Harbour (via Basingstoke), Salisbury and Weymouth.
Platform 5 – Portsmouth Direct Line services, Alton line and Basingstoke stopping services.
Platform 6 – West-facing bay platform, used by the first train of the day to Portsmouth Harbour via Eastleigh, and often used to stable trains in the event of a train failure.

Freight
Woking still retains two sets of sidings, each to the west of the station. The down side yard, between the station and Woking junction, is now a Network Rail permanent way maintenance depot and aggregates stone depot operated by Day Aggregates. The up side sidings are used to stable specialist track maintenance machines and out of service passenger trains.

In popular culture

The station was destroyed in H. G. Wells's The War of the Worlds.
Woking Station can be seen at the beginning of the 1995 music video for 'You Do Something To Me' by Paul Weller.
In the television adaptation of the Philip K. Dick story "The Commuter" for the series Philip K. Dick's Electric Dreams, railway worker Ed Jacobson (played by Timothy Spall) works at Woking station, and discovers a non-existent destination on the Alton line.
 Seated Man, created in 2011 by the artist, Sean Henry, was installed on platform 1 in August 2017.

Notes

References

Bibliography

External links
Woking Borough Council, 'Woking's railway'

Railway stations in Surrey
Former London and South Western Railway stations
Railway stations in Great Britain opened in 1838
Railway stations served by South Western Railway
DfT Category B stations
Woking